Nymburk District is a district in the Central Bohemian Region of the Czech Republic. Its capital is the town of Nymburk.

Administrative division
Nymburk District is divided into three administrative districts of municipalities with extended competence: Nymburk, Lysá nad Labem and Poděbrady.

List of municipalities
Towns are marked in bold and market towns in italics:

Běrunice -
Bobnice -
Bříství -
Budiměřice -
Chleby -
Choťánky -
Chotěšice -
Chrást -
Chroustov -
Čilec -
Činěves -
Dlouhopolsko -
Dobšice -
Dvory -
Dymokury -
Hořany -
Hořátev -
Hradčany -
Hradištko -
Hrubý Jeseník -
Jíkev -
Jiřice -
Jizbice -
Kamenné Zboží -
Kněžice -
Kněžičky -
Kolaje -
Kostelní Lhota -
Kostomlátky -
Kostomlaty nad Labem -
Košík -
Kounice -
Kouty -
Kovanice -
Krchleby -
Křečkov -
Křinec -
Libice nad Cidlinou -
Loučeň -
Lysá nad Labem -
Mcely -
Městec Králové -
Milčice -
Milovice -
Netřebice -
Nový Dvůr -
Nymburk -
Odřepsy -
Okřínek -
Opočnice -
Opolany -
Oseček -
Oskořínek -
Ostrá -
Pátek -
Písková Lhota -
Písty -
Poděbrady -
Podmoky -
Přerov nad Labem -
Rožďalovice -
Sadská -
Sány -
Seletice -
Semice -
Senice -
Sloveč -
Sokoleč -
Stará Lysá -
Starý Vestec -
Straky -
Stratov -
Třebestovice -
Úmyslovice -
Velenice -
Velenka -
Vestec -
Vlkov pod Oškobrhem -
Vrbice -
Vrbová Lhota -
Všechlapy -
Vykáň -
Záhornice -
Zbožíčko -
Žitovlice -
Zvěřínek

Geography

The surface of the district is has a distinctly flat character, a significant part of the district lies in the Polabí lowland. The territory extends into three geomorphological mesoregions: Central Elbe Table (most of the territory), Jizera Table (small parts in the west and north) and East Elbe Table (very small part in the east).

The most important river is the Elbe, flowing from the south to the west. The north of the district is drained by the Mrlina (a tributary of the Elbe). Several kilometres of the Cidlina also flow through the territory before its confluence with the Elbe. There are also several artificial lakes in the vicinity of the Elbe, created by flooding sand quarries.

There are no large-scale protected areas.

Demographics

Most populated municipalities

Economy
The largest employers with its headquarters in Nymburk District and at least 500 employers are:

Transport
The D11 motorway from Prague to Hradec Králové passes through the southern part of the district.

Sights

The most important monuments in the district, protected as national cultural monuments, are:
Slavník gord in Libice nad Cidlinou
Crematorium in Nymburk
Hydroelectric power plant in Poděbrady

The best-preserved settlements and archaeological sites, protected as monument reservations and monument zones, are:
Bošín (monument reservation)
Area of the Slavník gord in Libice nad Cidlinou (monument reservation)
Lysá nad Labem
Nymburk
Poděbrady
Pojedy
Sovenice
Vinice

The most visited tourist destinations are the Mirakulum amusement park in Milovice, Loučeň Castle, and Chleby Zoo.

Notes

References

External links

Nymburk District profile on the Czech Statistical Office's website

 
Districts of the Czech Republic